World Series of Fighting 24: Fitch vs. Okami was a mixed martial arts event held  in Mashantucket, Connecticut, United States. This event aired live on NBCSN in the U.S and on Fight Network in Canada.

Background
The main event was a welterweight fight between UFC veterans Jon Fitch and Yushin Okami.
The co-main event was a fight for the WSOF Heavyweight Championship between champion Blagoy Ivanov making his first defense of his title against challenger Derrick Mehmen.

Results

See also 
 World Series of Fighting
 List of WSOF champions
 List of WSOF events

References

World Series of Fighting events
2015 in mixed martial arts
2015 in sports in Connecticut